Barbora Purchartová (born 9 May 1992) is a Czech volleyball player, playing as a middle-blocker. She is part of the Czech Republic women's national volleyball team.

She competed at the 2015 Women's European Volleyball Championship. and 2019 Women's European Volleyball League, winning a gold medal.

On club level she plays for Dauphines Charleroi.

References

External links
 
Volleyball Bundesliga Player Profile 

1992 births
Living people
Czech women's volleyball players
Place of birth missing (living people)
Middle blockers
Expatriate volleyball players in Austria
Czech expatriate sportspeople in Austria